The Lady Tasting Tea: How Statistics Revolutionized Science in the Twentieth Century is a book by David Salsburg about the history of modern statistics and the role it played in the development of science and industry.

The title comes from the "lady tasting tea", an example from the famous book, The Design of Experiments, by Ronald A. Fisher. Regarding Fisher's example, the statistician Debabrata Basu wrote that "the famous case of the 'lady tasting tea'" was "one of the two supporting pillars [...] of the randomization analysis of experimental data".

Summary

The book discusses the statistical revolution which took place in the twentieth century, where science shifted from a deterministic view (Clockwork universe) to a perspective concerned primarily with probabilities and distributions and parameters.  Salsburg does this through a collection of stories about the people who were fundamental in the change, starting with men like R.A. Fisher and Karl Pearson.  He discusses at length how many of these people had their own philosophy of statistics, and in particular their own understanding of statistical significance.  Throughout, he introduces in a very nontechnical fashion a variety of statistical ideas and methods, such as maximum likelihood estimation and bootstrapping.

Reception
The book was generally well-received, receiving coverage in a variety of medical and statistical journals.  Reviewers from the medical field enjoyed Salsburg's coverage of Fisher's opposition to early research on the health effects of tobacco.  Critics disagreed with certain opinions that Salsburg voiced, like his barebones portrayal of Bayesian statistics and his seeming disdain for pure mathematics.  Nevertheless, almost all reviewers appreciated the interesting read and recommended the book to people in their field as well as a general audience.

List of scholars mentioned
The book discusses a wide variety of statisticians, mathematicians, as well as other scientists and scholars.  This is a list of those mentioned, broken down into groups of chapters.

Chapters 1-9

Chapters 10-19

Chapters 20-29

References

External links
Publisher's web page

2002 non-fiction books
Statistics books
History of probability and statistics
Henry Holt and Company books